Mott Snowfield is a snowfield in the northeast of Trinity Peninsula, Antarctica, between Laclavère Plateau and Antarctic Sound. It was named by the UK Antarctic Place-Names Committee for Peter G. Mott, leader of the Falkland Islands and Dependencies Aerial Survey Expedition, 1955–57.

Map
 Trinity Peninsula. Scale 1:250000 topographic map No. 5697. Institut für Angewandte Geodäsie and British Antarctic Survey, 1996.

References

Snow fields of Antarctica
Bodies of ice of Graham Land
Landforms of Trinity Peninsula